The 1927 Swedish Ice Hockey Championship was the sixth season of the Swedish Ice Hockey Championship, the national championship of Sweden. IK Gota won the championship.

Tournament

First round 
 VIK Västerås HK - Karlbergs BK 2:3

Second round
 Djurgårdens IF - Karlbergs BK 6:3

Semifinals 
 IK Göta - Hammarby IF 5:3
 Djurgårdens IF - Södertälje SK 5:4

Final 
 IK Göta - Djurgårdens IF 4:3

External links
 Season on hockeyarchives.info

Champ
Swedish Ice Hockey Championship seasons